José María Velasco Ibarra Airport  is an airport serving Macará, a city in the Loja Province of Ecuador. Macará is on Ecuador's border with Peru.

The airport is named for José María Velasco Ibarra, a former president of Ecuador.

The airport is within the city, and has mountainous terrain north, and rising terrain in all other quadrants. The Macara non-directional beacon (Ident: MAC) is located on the field.

See also

Transport in Ecuador
List of airports in Ecuador

References

External links
OpenStreetMap - Macará
OurAirports - Macará
SkyVector - Macará
FallingRain - Macará Airport

Airports in Ecuador
Buildings and structures in Loja Province